Basiliobelus is a  genus of beetles which belong to the family Belidae.

References

Belidae